Ikabod Bubwit (literally "Ikabod the Small Rodent", "Ikabod the Small Rat", or "Ikabod the Mouse") is one of the most noteworthy and most memorable comic book, comic strip, and cartoon characters created in the 1980s by Nonoy Marcelo, one of the foremost cartoonists in the Philippines. Ikabod Bubwit himself is considered as the most famous mouse character created by Marcelo. In the comic strip Ikabod, Ikabod Bubwit was the representation of the humorous illustration of the socio-political woes of ordinary Filipinos, and the comic strip itself was used at times by Marcelo in re-imagining and portraying Filipino political figures, including Ferdinand Marcos, Cory Aquino, Joseph Estrada, and Gloria Macapagal Arroyo. Ikabod Bubwit was portrayed by Marcelo as an “irreverent mouse” with “funny antics” who lived in Dagalandia (literally "Mouseland" or "Ratland"). Ikabod's hometown, Dagalandia, was described as a “recast” of “the Philippines as a nation” with “an apt mirror image for the turbulent setting of the Philippines” during the present and in the past. The satirical comic strip about Ikabod Bubwit ran from the late 1970s through 2002.

See also
 Barok
 List of fictional mice and rats

References

Filipino comics characters
Fictional Filipino people
Fictional mice and rats